Samlingspartiet  may refer to:

 National Coalition Party of Finland - Samlingspartiet, Kokoomus
 Coalition Party (Norway) - Samlingspartiet
 Moderate Party of Sweden - Moderata samlingspartiet